Asad Khan may refer to:

 Asad Khan (cricketer) (born 1997), Afghan cricketer
Asad Khan (sitarist) (born 1982), Indian sitarist and music composer
Asad Khan (Mughal noble), 17th–18th century minister of the Mughal Empire
 Asad Khan, Khuzestan, a village in Iran
 Asadkhan, Razavi Khorasan, a village in Iran
 Asad Ahmed Khan, a fictional character in the Indian soap opera Qubool Hai
 Asad Ali Khan (1937–2011), Indian musician who played the plucked string instrument rudra veena
 Asad Jahangir Khan (born 1945), former first-class cricketer and senior police officer in Pakistan
 Asad Ullah Khan, Indian microbiologist and biochemist
 Asad Majeed Khan, Pakistani ambassador to the United States